Elizabeth Sagal (born October 9, 1961) is an American actress, screenwriter and film editor. Sagal is part of a family of entertainment industry professionals. She is the daughter of director Boris Sagal and the stepdaughter of Marge Champion. In addition to her twin sister Jean Sagal, two of her other siblings, older sister Katey Sagal and brother Joey Sagal, are notable in the industry and her other brother, David Sagal, is an attorney married to actress McNally Sagal.

Early life
Sagal's father, Boris Sagal, was a Ukrainian-Jewish immigrant who worked as a television director.

Career

Acting
Sagal and her twin sister, Jean Sagal served for a time as the "Doublemint Twins" in the ad campaign by Doublemint gum.

The pair also appeared together as cheerleaders in the 1982 movie, Grease 2. In the 1980s, Liz and Jean starred in the television series Double Trouble that ran from 1984 to 1985. Sagal has since appeared on such shows as Knots Landing and Picket Fences.

She played a part in the film Howard the Duck, as a member of the fictional band "Cherry Bomb", in conjunction with which she contributed vocals to the songs "Hunger City", "Don't Turn Away (Reprise)", "It Don't Come Cheap" and "Howard the Duck".

Writing
She has worked as a writer on such shows as Mad About You, Monk and Charmed, also serving as executive story editor on the last. She also wrote for the Netflix reboot of Lost in Space.

Film credits

Writer
Mad About You (1997)
Two Guys, a Girl and a Pizza Place (1998–2002)
Monk (2004)
Charmed (2005–2006)
Vanished (2007)
Sons of Anarchy (2009–2013)
Da Vinci's Demons (2015)
Banshee (2016)
Feed the Beast (2016)
Loco x vos (2016)
Midnight, Texas (2017)
Lost in Space (2019)
Cowboy Bebop (2021)

Actress
Grease 2 (1982) - Cheerleader Twin
Flashdance (1983) - Sunny
Double Trouble (1984, TV Series) - Allison Foster
Howard the Duck (1986) - Ronette, Cherry Bomb
Skinheads (1989) - Amy
Life on the Edge (1992) - Mandy
Picket Fences (1993, TV Series) - Ellen Shannon

References

External links

 

1961 births
American female dancers
American dancers
American film actresses
American people of Ukrainian-Jewish descent
American television actresses
American television writers
Identical twin actresses
Living people
Actresses from Santa Monica, California
American twins
American women television writers
20th-century American actresses
Writers from Los Angeles
Screenwriters from California
21st-century American women